Laybourn is a surname. Notable people with the surname include:

 Keith Laybourn (born 1946), British historian
 Thomas Laybourn (born 1977), Danish badminton player
 Vilhelm Laybourn (1885–1955), Danish modern pentathlete

See also
 Lambourn (surname)
 Laybourne